Giorgi Merabovich Megreladze (born 21 July 1978) is a retired Georgian footballer. He is the son of former Georgian football player and FC Torpedo Kutaisi star Merab Megreladze. At the start of the 2006–07 season Megreladze signed up to play for FK Baku. He also played, among other clubs, for FC Dinamo Tbilisi and FC Torpedo Kutaisi. With the Georgia national football team he won only one game, on 12 August 1998 against Azerbaijan. In 2009, he scored the first ever UEFA Europa League goal.

References

External links

Profile at KLISF

1978 births
Living people
Footballers from Georgia (country)
Georgia (country) international footballers
FC Dinamo Tbilisi players
FC Baku players
FC Torpedo Kutaisi players
FC Neftekhimik Nizhnekamsk players
Patraikos F.C. players
Expatriate footballers from Georgia (country)
Expatriate footballers in Greece
Expatriate footballers in Russia
Expatriate footballers in Azerbaijan
Expatriate footballers in Kazakhstan
Expatriate footballers in Uzbekistan
Expatriate sportspeople from Georgia (country) in Greece
Expatriate sportspeople from Georgia (country) in Russia
Expatriate sportspeople from Georgia (country) in Azerbaijan
Expatriate sportspeople from Georgia (country) in Kazakhstan
Expatriate sportspeople from Georgia (country) in Uzbekistan
Association football forwards